The 1979 West Dorset District Council election was held on Thursday 3 May 1979 to elect councillors to West Dorset District Council in England. It took place on the same day as the general election and other district council elections in the United Kingdom. This was the third election to the district council, the election saw terms of councillors extended from three to four years.

The 1979 election saw the Independent councillors maintain their majority control on the Council.

Ward results

Beaminster

Bothenhampton

Bradford Abbas

Bradpole

Bridport

Broadmayne

Broadwindsor

Burton Bradstock

Caundle Vale

Cerne Valley

Charminster

Charmouth

Chesil Bank

Chickerell

Dorchester Central

Dorchester East

Dorchester West

Frome Valley

Halstock

Holnest

Loders

Lyme Regis

Maiden Newton

Netherbury

Owermoigne

Piddle Valley

Puddletown

Queen Thorne

Sherborne

Stinsford

Symondsbury

Thorncombe

Tolpuddle

Whitchurch Canonicorum

Winterborne St Martin

Yetminster

References

West Dorset
1979
20th century in Dorset